GT500 may refer to:

 GT500, the top class of Super GT, the top-level sports car racing series in Japan
 GT500 model of the Shelby Mustang, a variant of the Ford Mustang